The 2020 African Nations Championship Final was a football match to determine the winners of the CHAN 2020 tournament and took place on 7 February 2021 at the Stade Ahmadou Ahidjo in Yaoundé, Cameroon. It was contested by Mali and Morocco.

Morocco won 2-0 to claim their second title. By doing so, they became the first team to win back-to-back titles since the tournament's inaugural edition in 2009. They also tied with DR Congo as the most successful teams in the tournament.

Venue

The final was held at the multi-purpose Stade Ahmadou Ahidjo in the capital city of
Yaoundé, Cameroon. Built in 1972, it currently has a capacity of 40,000 seats. It is used mostly for football matches and is named after Ahmadou Ahidjo, who was President of Cameroon from 1960 until 1982. The stadium has been renovated in 2016 ahead of the Africa Women Cup of Nations tournament. It is the home stadium of Canon Yaoundé and Tonnerre Yaoundé. The stadium is also known as the home venue of the Cameroonian national football team, who drew the stadium's record attendance of 120,000 in a football match in the 1980s.

Background
Mali and Morocco both made their 4th appearance at the tournament, and their second final. Mali previously contested the final in 2016 losing 3-0 to DR Congo. Morocco meanwhile reached the final of the previous edition defeating Nigeria 4-0 to become the first host nation to win the title. The final was also the first meeting between the two sides at the CHAN tournament.

Mali were 57th in the FIFA World Rankings (9th among African nations), while Morocco were 35th (4th among African nations).

Route to the final

Match

Summary

Details
<onlyinclude>

See also
2020 African Nations Championship

References

External links
CAFOnline.com, CAFonline.com

2020
Final
Mali national football team matches
Morocco national football team matches
African Nations Championship Final